Rosellinia necatrix is a fungal plant pathogen infecting several hosts including apples, apricots, avocados, cassava, strawberries, pears, hop. citruses and Narcissus, causing white root rot.

References

External links 

 Index Fungorum
 USDA ARS Fungal Database

Fungal plant pathogens and diseases
Apple tree diseases
Stone fruit tree diseases
Pear tree diseases
Avocado tree diseases
Root vegetable diseases
Fungal strawberry diseases
Food plant pathogens and diseases
Fungal citrus diseases
Fungi described in 1904
Xylariales